Diu Island is an island off the southern coast of Gujarat's Kathiawar peninsula, separated from the mainland by a tidal creek. It has an area of 40 km², and a population of 44,110 (2001 census).

Administratively it belongs to the Diu district of the Dadra and Nagar Haveli and Daman and Diu union territory of India, both Damaon and Diu share the same elected representative as the member of parliament. The island lies 5 km to the east of Diu Head.

The town of Diu and Diu Fort are located on the island. There is also a domestic airport, Diu Airport.

History
Throughout the 15th century, especially under Muzaffar Han, Diu flourished as a major port of the Gujarati state, with a notable fleet. From 1510 it became the seat of the governors of Surat. In 1535 the viceroy Nuno da Cunha made a treaty with Bahadur Sah, the sultan of Khambhat, for the use of the port by Portugal. Despite several attacks by Ottomans and Arabs, the Portuguese, who by 1541 had completed their massive fort, would remain in control of the island until 1961, when it became a union territory with Daman.

The Ethiopian highlands, through the ports of Massawa and Zeila, imported Indian textiles and exported to the island, slaves, wax, butter, civet and ivory. A population of Ethiopian slaves is reported in Portuguese sources to have lived in Diu and in the neighbouring area in the early 16th century.

Churches

St Paul's Church
The construction of this church was started in 1601 and was completed by 1610. The Church is dedicated to Our Lady of Immaculate Conception in 1691. Illuminated by flood lights (by night time), the main façade of the church is perhaps the most elaborate of all Portuguese churches in India. In architectural style, the is Gothic and  resembles Bom Jesus Church at Old Goa. The wood - panelling of the church is rated one of the best in church craftsmanship. The church adorned with curiously treated volutes and shell - like motifs and the magnificent wood carving.

St. Thomas Church
Now a museum, the old St. Thomas Church houses antique statues, various stone inscriptions of the earlier rulers, wooden carvings and idols. The huge edifice in gothic architecture was built in 1598. A part of it has been converted into a museum - an archaeological treasure house. The artifacts displayed date back to the 16th century and beyond.

Forts

Diu Fort

The Diu Fort, is located on the west coast of India in Diu, a Union Territory, administered by the Government of India. The fort was built by the Portuguese during their colonial rule of the Diu island. The Diu town is located to the west of the fort. The fort was built in 1535 subsequent to a defense alliance forged by Bahadur Shah, the Sultan of Gujarat and the Portuguese when Humayun, the Mughal Emperor, waged war to annex this territory. Some additions made in 1541 and the fort was strengthened over the years, till 1546. Portuguese ruled over this territory from 1537 (from the year they took control of the fort and also the Diu town fully) until 1961. They were forced to quit only in December 1961 (even though India became an independent country in 1947) during a military action called the Operation Vijay launched by the Government of India, and thereafter Diu was annexed by India as a centrally administered Union Territory.

This massive, fairly well-preserved Portuguese fort with its double moat must once have been impregnable. But years of sea erosion and neglect are leading to its slow collapse. Cannonballs litter the place, and the ramparts have a superb array of cannons. The lighthouse is Diu's highest point, with a beam that reaches 32 km in every direction. There are several small chapels, one holding engraved tombstone fragments. Part of the fort also serves as the island's jail.

Fortim do Mar
Built right at the mouth of the creek, the fortress of Fortim do Mar (Sea Fort or Pani-Kotha) is a magnificent stone structure in the sea. Approximately one nautical mile (1.852 km) from the Diu jetty, it also has a light house and a small chapel dedicated to Our Lady of the Sea. The fortress creates a beautiful view whether seen from the jetty, from the villages of Ghoghla or from Diu proper, or from the Fort itself.

References

Islands of Dadra and Nagar Haveli and Daman and Diu
Diu district
Tourist attractions in Diu district
Islands of India
Populated places in India